Desconocido (Spanish: "unknown" or "stranger") or Desconocida (feminine), or plurals, may refer to:

Music
Desconocida,  fourth studio album by Spanish singer Marta Sanchez (in 1998)

Songs
 "Desconocido", a 1985 single by Golpes Bajos (1982-1998) 
 "Desconocido", on the 2003 album Endorfinas en la Mente by Chambao
 "Desconocidos", Luis Villa Spain in the OTI Festival 1998
 "Desconocidos", Fantine (musician) 2012
 "Desconocidos", Manuel Turizo 2018
 "Desconocido Soy", on Live from Austin, TX (David Byrne album)

Other
 "El desconocido", Spanish title of the 2015 film Retribution by Dani de la Torre